Tun Tun Naung (born 30 April 1963) is a Burmese military officer and incumbent Minister of Border Affairs of Myanmar. Tun Tun Naung is a career soldier, and currently holds the rank of Lieutenant General. Since he is a Union Minister of Border Affairs, he is also a member of the Union Government and National Defence and Security Council.

Career
Tun Tun Naung was born in 1963 and graduated from the 25th intake of Defence Service Academy. His colleagues from 25th intake are General Mya Tun Oo, member of SAC and Lieutenant-General Aung Lin Dwe, Secretary of SAC.

In 2010, he became the commander of 88th Light Infantry Division with the rank of Colonel.  Later he became the commander of Eastern Central Command. In 2012  he became the commander of Northern Command with the rank Brigadier General and became the commander of Yangon Regional Command with the rank of Major General in 2014. In August 2015, he became the Chief of Bureau of Special Operations No (1), one of the high-level field units of Myanmar Army. In 2020 December, he was moved to Tatmadaw reserved force and became a member of Peace Negotiation Committee of Tatmadaw.

After 2021 coup, Tun Tun Naung was appointed as Union Minister for Ministry of Border Affairs. He is also a member of National Defence and Security Council.

References

Burmese generals
Living people
Government ministers of Myanmar
1963 births
Defence Services Academy alumni